Carlia bicarinata is a species of skink, commonly known as the rainbow-skink, in the genus Carlia. It is endemic to Papua New Guinea.

References

Carlia
Reptiles described in 1877
Reptiles of Papua New Guinea
Endemic fauna of Papua New Guinea
Taxa named by William John Macleay
Skinks of New Guinea